Shanbally (Irish: An Seanbhaile, meaning "the old town/homestead") is a small village located in south east County Cork on the N28 road. Shanbally is home to a Catholic church, a primary school, a pub, a shop and Shamrocks GAA club. The village is located close to Ringaskiddy, Monkstown and Carrigaline.

The local Catholic church is the church of the Immaculate Heart of Mary.

See also 
List of towns and villages in Ireland

References

Towns and villages in County Cork